Accursius (c.1182–1263) was a Roman jurist.

Accursius may also refer to:

Franciscus Accursius (1225–1293), Italian lawyer, Bolognia, the son of Accursius – both father and son are at times referred to as "Accursius of Bolognia"
Mariangelus Accursius (1489–1546), Italian humanist and scholar
Accursius, a saint and companion in martyrdom to Berard of Carbio